United Nations Security Council resolution 669, adopted unanimously on 24 September 1990, after recalling Resolution 661 (1990) and Article 50 of Chapter VII of the United Nations Charter, the council was conscious of the increasing number of requests for assistance have been received under Article 50, relating to international sanctions against Iraq after its invasion of Kuwait.

Article 50 states that if the Security Council is enforcing sanctions against any state, whether it be a Member of the United Nations or not, a country that is confronted with economic problems as a result of the measures has the right to consult the council to find a solution to the problem. 21 states, including Jordan, which were experiencing adverse consequences of the sanctions, filed requests in this manner.

In this regard, the council requested the Security Council Committee established in Resolution 661 (1990) to examine requests for assistance under Article 50. It reported back by asking Member States to support other states that had been affected by the sanctions on Iraq.

See also
 Foreign relations of Iraq
 Gulf War
 Invasion of Kuwait
 Iraq–Kuwait relations
 List of United Nations Security Council Resolutions 601 to 700 (1987–1991)

References

External links
 
Text of the Resolution at undocs.org

 0669
 0669
Gulf War
1990 in Iraq
1990 in Kuwait
September 1990 events
 0669